The episodes of  anime series created by Takeshi Konomi are directed by Takayuki Hamana, animated by Trans Arts, and co-produced by Nihon Ad Systems, J.C.Staff, and Production I.G. The anime is an adaptation of Konomi's Prince of Tennis Japanese manga series. The series revolves around a 12-year-old tennis prodigy named Ryoma Echizen, who moves back to his native Japan in order to attend his father's alma mater, Seishun Academy, a private middle school famous for its strong tennis team.

The anime series first aired on the terrestrial Japanese network TV Tokyo from October 10, 2001 to March 30, 2005, airing a total of one-hundred and seventy-eight episodes, which spanned across forty-five DVDs in Japan. In April 2006, an OVA continuation of the anime began to be released on DVD, totaling thirteen episodes across seven DVDs. A second OVA also began being released on DVD on June 22, 2007. It spanned a total of six episodes that are spread across three DVDs, the last of which being released on January 25, 2008. The third and final installment in the National OVA series contains seven episodes spread across four DVDs released from April 25, 2008 to January 23, 2009. The OVAs are animated by Production I.G and Bandai Visual, with the latter also handling the DVD distribution of the OVAs in Japan along with Amuse Soft Entertainment.

Viz Media handled the distribution of the series in North America, where the episodes debuted as streaming media on Viz's and Cartoon Network's joint online broadband service called Toonami Jetstream on July 14, 2006. It first began airing on North American television as part of Toonami's Saturday programming block on December 23, 2006. However, it was removed from Toonami's schedule on June 9, 2007, and was also removed from Toonami Jetstream after episode fifty's broadcast on December 3, 2007. In April 2021, Funimation announced they acquired the series.

As of January 15, 2008, a total of four DVD compilations, containing the first fifty episodes, have been released by Viz Media. All four compilations contain three discs, each containing four episodes, save the final discs of the first two compilations, which contain five episodes.

The 1986 J-pop song Valentine Kiss by Sayuri Kokushō was covered multiple times by multiple characters in the series. From February 2004 through February 2010, a total of nine different versions were released (seven individually, and the final two together). The first one, featuring the character Keigo Atobe (voiced by Junichi Suwabe) reached #14 on the Oricon charts.

Episode list 
Notes concerning English titles and airdates
The English titles for the first fifty episodes are of the officially released titles by Viz Media. The remaining English titles are unofficial translations of the original Japanese titles.
The English airdates are of the Toonami Jetstream premieres, which came before Toonami's television broadcasts of the episodes.

Seasons 1 and 2: 2001–02

Seasons 3 and 4: 2002-03

Season 5: 2003–04 
Episodes 98–115: Training to Defeat Rikkai Jr. High Saga

Episodes 116–128: Kanto Tournament Saga - Part V: The Finals - Rikkai Jr. High

Season 6: 4/2004 – 12/2004 
Episodes 129–135: Recreation Saga - Part II

Episodes 136–146: Junior Selection Camp Saga

 
Episodes 147–160: Junior Selection Team vs. U.S. Coast Team Saga

Episodes 161–165: Recreation Saga - Part III

Opening & Ending Music

Season 7: 1/2005 – 3/2005 
Episodes 166–176: Intraschool Rankings Saga - Part III

Episodes 177–178: Start of Nationals Arc

Opening & Ending Music

OVAs

National Tournament

National Tournament 
OVA series Episodes 1–13: The Nationals Arc

National Semifinals 
OVA series Episodes 14–19: The Nationals Semifinal Arc

National Finals 
OVA series Episode 20–26: The National Tournament Finals Arc

Another Story 
OVA series Episode 1–4: ~Messages from Past and Future~

Another Story II 
OVA series Episode 1–4: ~The Times We Shared~

The Prince of Tennis II 
Episodes 1–13: ~2nd stringers arc~

The Prince of Tennis II SPECIAL 
OVA series Episodes 1–7: The Prince of Tennis II

The Prince of Tennis II OVA vs. Genius 10 
OVA series Episodes 1–10: ~1st stringers arc~

The Prince of Tennis II: Hyotei vs. Rikkai Game of Future

References

External links 
 
Official Prince of Tennis website 
Teni-puri-news website 
TV Tokyo's Prince of Tennis website